

The Bede BD-8 was an aerobatics aircraft developed in the United States in the mid-1970s.  It was a low-wing, single-seat monoplane of conventional configuration, albeit very short-coupled, and of all-metal construction.  The single prototype was under construction by Jim Bede when his company, Bede Aircraft, faced bankruptcy in 1977.  The incomplete BD-8 was purchased by Mike Huffman, who completed its construction in 1980. It first flew on May 14, 1980.

Specifications

See also

Notes

References
  
 Sport Aviation (January 1981).
 Owner's website

BD-008
1980s United States sport aircraft
Single-engined tractor aircraft
Low-wing aircraft
Homebuilt aircraft
Aircraft first flown in 1980